The South African Railways Class 9 4-6-2 of 1904 was a steam locomotive from the pre-Union era in Transvaal Colony.

In 1904, the Central South African Railways placed five Class 9 steam locomotives with a  Pacific type wheel arrangement in service. In 1912, when they were assimilated into the South African Railways, they were renumbered but retained their Class 9 designation.

Central South African Railways

Establishment
Upon its establishment in 1902 at the end of the Second Boer War, the Central South African Railways (CSAR) inherited a variety of locomotive types from the Imperial Military Railways (IMR), which had been established by the British military during the war through the absorption of the separate state and other railways of the Zuid-Afrikaansche Republiek (ZAR) and the Oranje-Vrijstaat as possession was obtained of the territories of these two republics.

The larger two of these constituent railways were the Nederlandsche-Zuid-Afrikaansche Spoorweg-Maatschappij (NZASM), which operated between Pretoria, capital of the ZAR, and Lourenço Marques, capital of the Portuguese colony of Moçambique, and the Oranje-Vrijstaat Gouwerment-Spoorwegen (OVGS). Smaller constituents were the Pretoria-Pietersburg Railway (PPR) and the Selati Railway.

Of the mixed amalgam of locomotives which were inherited from these railways, the best was probably the 8th Class , designed by H.M. Beatty of the Cape Government Railways (CGR). These locomotives were brand new, having been acquired by the IMR shortly before the end of the war, and featured a bar frame, narrow firebox and cylinders with overhead slide valves actuated by Stephenson valve gear.

Transformation
These designs by Hyde were cutting edge technology at the time.

For the express passenger service between Johannesburg and Pretoria and long-distance passenger services to Cape Town, the CSAR also introduced passenger coaches with closed vestibules, concertina connections and Gould knuckle couplers. This automatic coupling system would only begin to be implemented on the South African Railways (SAR) in 1927. At the time, all this modern equipment placed the CSAR ahead of both the CGR and Natal Government Railways (NGR) in terms of technical advancement.

Design
The first locomotives to be designed by Hyde for the CSAR were based on Beatty’s 8th Class 4-8-0 locomotive. Hyde designed this  Pacific version which became the CSAR's Class 9 and, at the same time, he extrapolated this design to a 4-6-4 tank locomotive for heavy suburban trains which later became the SAR Class F. Both locomotives were ordered in 1904.

Five Pacific locomotives were ordered from the Vulcan Foundry of Newton-le-Willows in England and delivered in 1904. They were numbered in the range from 600 to 604 and designated Class 9 by the CSAR.

Characteristics
The locomotives had bar frames and used saturated steam. They had balanced slide valves, arranged above the cylinders and actuated by Stephenson valve gear through rocker shafts. The firebox was fitted with Stroudley's flexible stays and the back casing plate was flanged outwards to facilitate the removal of the internal firebox for renewals.

As built, the smokebox was equipped with openings on its sides, near the front, with covers which each had a handle by which it could be opened with a half turn to give direct access to the inside of the smokebox. These openings were known by a variety of terms, the most common being "cinder pocket" or "cleaning hole and cap". Its purpose was, most likely, to facilitate cleaning of the spark arrestor screens to overcome clogging without having to open the smokebox door. The cover handles were attached to the smokebox side by a small chain. Judging from photographs, these covers were removed and the openings closed off in the SAR era.

Renumbering
When the Union of South Africa was established on 31 May 1910, the three Colonial government railways (CGR, NGR and CSAR) were united under a single administration to control and administer the railways, ports and harbours of the Union. Although the South African Railways and Harbours came into existence in 1910, the actual classification and renumbering of all the rolling stock of the three constituent railways were only implemented with effect from 1 January 1912.

In 1912, these locomotives were renumbered in the range from 727 to 731 on the SAR, but retained their Class 9 classification. Their tenders, which were unique to the Class, were designated Type XM3.

Service
The Class 9 was very useful for passenger work with moderate loads and worked the Durban-bound mail trains from Johannesburg as far as Charlestown on the Transvaal-Natal border for many years. Later they served mainly on mainline passenger working elsewhere in Transvaal, ending their days working out of Pretoria on the Pietersburg line in the 1920s. They were withdrawn by 1926.

Illustration
The main picture is a builder's picture of the Class 9. In the picture below, the cinder pocket cover can be seen above the head of the person at far left.

References

1630
1630
4-6-2 locomotives
2′C1′ n2 locomotives
Vulcan Foundry locomotives
Cape gauge railway locomotives 
Railway locomotives introduced in 1904
1904 in South Africa
Scrapped locomotives